Hilma Wolitzer (born 1930) is an American novelist.

Career 
Wolitzer's first novel for adults, Ending, was published in 1974. In his review of the novel, lead New York Times critic Anatole Broyard wrote, “After finishing Wolitzer’s book, I felt as if I had been on the brink of the abyss, pulled back by a last‐minute reprieve. My first impulse was to rush out and live, to grasp at existence as every instant of it was climactic . . .  Apocalyptic as sounds, Ending made me feel I never wanted to take anything for granted again. If you have ever smelled death, really recognized it, life is a miracle. You can understand Marie Antoinette's saying, to the executioner, on the platform of the guillotine, ‘one more moment of happiness!’” Ending was the loose basis for Bob Fosse's 1979 film All That Jazz.

The recipient of Guggenheim and NEA fellowships and an Award in Literature from the American Academy and Institute of Arts and Letters, Wolitzer wrote for the TV series Family.

Personal life 
Wolitzer's daughter, Meg Wolitzer, is also a writer.

Bibliography

Novels 
 Ending (1974)
 In the Flesh (1977)
 Hearts (1980)
 In the Palomar Arms (1983)
 Silver (1988)
 Tunnel of Love (1994)
 The Doctor's Daughter (2006)
 Summer Reading (2007)
 An Available Man (2012)

YA fiction 
 Introducing Shirley Braverman (1975)
 Out of Love (1976)
 Toby Lived Here (1980)
 Wish You Were Here (1984)

Non-fiction 
 The Company of Writers (2001)

Short story collections 
 Today a Woman Went Mad in the Supermarket (2021)

References

External links 
 Hilma Wolitzer at Fresh Fiction
 Anatole Broyard in the New York Times on “Ending”
 Hazlitt on “Ending” and “All That Jazz”

Living people
1930 births
21st-century American novelists
American women novelists
Place of birth missing (living people)
21st-century American women writers
20th-century American novelists
20th-century American women writers